Rodi or Rodiya are reported to be an untouchable social group or caste amongst the Sinhalese people of Sri Lanka. Their status was very similar to all the Untouchable castes of India with segregated communities, ritualised begging, economically weakest section of the society.

History 
The various stories on the origin of the Rodi caste are contradictory and therefore far from certain. According to Mahavams Chronicle, Rodiyas were the 24,000 South Indian Dalits brought as prisoners of war from South India by King Gajabahu (114-136 A.D.) of Ceylon. To prevent escape they were re-settled in the rural hill country Kotmale area of the Central Highlands of Ceylon. This Rodiya (origin: Indian word Rowdy meaning unruly and destructive behaviour) community were considered as untouchables due to their grotesque religious practices stemming from their South Indian tribal religious beliefs which involves Cannibalism and Black magic Practices that were inhuman, unclean, heretical (Heresy) practices which were loathed in disgust by the Native Sinhalese Buddhists of Ceylon. Rodis have their own mythical stories about their origin (Princess Ratnavalli story) have been passed down orally by their generations. They were considered so untouchable that the Sinhalese royal law prescribed the punishment to banish worst offenders and convicts to the Rodiya community which was considered a worst punishment than the capital punishment, i.e. the daughter of King Parakramabahu named Ratnavalli (also known as Navaratna Valli) secretly conniving with a Rodiya caste butcher (who was supplying venison to the royal court) shared a taste for human flesh (Cannibalism). This was later found out by the king and enraged by her serious offense, the King banished her to the Rodiya community, offering her as the bride to that same butcher. Some of these stories are found in published documents as well. Rodis were considered to be purely a low caste group. According to Kandyan law, the worst punishment for high caste nobles was the exiling them to the Rodi caste. Robert Knox (sailor) and Hugh Nevill are two of the prominent writers who have mentioned the Rodi Caste in their writings. Although these folklore tales do not provide many facts about the origins of the Rodi, they trace a connection between the daughter of King Parakramabahu and a butcher. Even today they practice deciet, witchcraft, voodoo, blackmagic, human sacrifice and cannibalism.

Modern times 
The British Government in London recalled from the service the British Colonial Governor Sir Thomas Maitland (British Army officer) on an offense of having an illicit affair with a Ceylonese untouchable Rodiya Caste dancing girl named Lovina Alfonso. Presumably her caste leaders seeing the rare opportunity to gain unprecedented political influence, used her for Honey trapping Sir Thomas Maitland to get him to marry her. In late 1930s before the granting of Independence to Ceylon by the British, Indian leader Mahatma Gandhi saw the potential to use the Rodiya Caste which had South Indian origin and their strong secret clandestine family network of widespread Rodiya population (who had changed their family names) pretending as members of other Castes of Sinhalese Buddhists and Sinhalese Christians in the island. Gandhi chose Rodiya community in Ceylon for his agenda of subversion against the British in the future Independent Dominion of Ceylon by using the Rodis as the main Indian Fifth column in Independent British Dominion of Ceylon. As a result the Subsequent Indian leadership and clandestine think tanks established and funded the Rodiya caste upliftment program known as Sarvodaya Shramadana movement employing one of the Rodiya Caste members, Dr. A T Ariyaratna, a school teacher, to form the Indian Sarvodaya Gandhians movement in the Dominion of Ceylon to fund and train the Rodiya caste people as subvertives and political agents on behalf of the Indian government. These Rodiya Caste Subvertives formed and operate the Trade Unions, Political Activist Groups and Marxist Political parties in post Independent Ceylon. Most of the traditional Rodiya Caste villages are concentrated around Mout Lavinia, Ratmalana, Moratuwa, Panadura, Galle, Kandy, Kotmale, Gampola, Badulla, Matale, Polonnaruwa and Anuradhapura areas.

Notable Rodiya Caste people 

 Peliyagoda David a.k.a Gongalegoda Banda - Rebel leader who participated in the 1848 rebellion against the British Colonial Government in Ceylon
 Puran Appu (Weerahannadige Francisco Fernando) - Rebel leader who luanched the 1848 rebellion against the British Colonial Government in Ceylon
 Lovina Alfonso - Exotic Dancer at Sir Thomas Maitland Colonial Governor's Residence
 Dr. A T Ariyaratne - Leader Sarvodaya Shramadana Movement
 Sunil Perera - Leader of the Musical group Gypsies
 Dr. N W N Jayasiri - Computer Database developer for Government of Sri Lanka
 Anura Kumara Dissanayake - Leader of the marxist political party and trade union network JVP
 Dr. Kumar Rupasinghe - Political Activist

See also

Rodiya language

References

Further reading
Boyle, Richard (1928). Ratnavalli's Children, Myth and Mystery of the Rodi
Raghavan, M. D. (1957). Handsome Beggars, The Rodiyas of Ceylon

External links
Ethnic Groups in Sri lanka - Rodiya
The Rodiya: Outcaste people of Sri Lanka
The Status of Nihali (On Nihali)
The story of the Rodi: Sri Lanka's 'untouchables'

Sinhalese castes